The office of the lieutenant governor of Utah was created in 1975. Nine people have held the position since then.

Prior to the creation of the lieutenant governor's office, the succession to the governorship of Utah was held by the Utah Secretary of State. The office of the secretary of state was abolished by the state legislature in 1976, and its duties were given to the newly created Office of the lieutenant governor. The lieutenant governor is elected on the same ticket as the governor.

The incumbent lieutenant governor is Republican Deidre Henderson, who has served since 2021.

Duties 
Utah has no secretary of state, and many of the functions that would commonly be served by a secretary of state are fulfilled by the lieutenant governor. The lieutenant governor's statutory duties include the oversight of all notaries public, the legal authentication of documents, maintaining oversight and regulation of registered lobbyists, certifying municipal annexations, and serving as the "keeper" of the Great Seal of the State of Utah. She has general oversight authority over all elections—federal, state, or local—that take place in Utah.

List of lieutenant governors

Parties

See also
Constitution of Utah

References 

 
1975 establishments in Utah